Corte McGuffey (born June 19, 1977) is a former quarterback for the New York/New Jersey Hitmen of the XFL. In 1999, he won the Harlon Hill Trophy for Player of the Year in NCAA Division II.

McGuffey was a dentist. He now lives in Wyoming.

References

Further reading

1977 births
Living people
American football quarterbacks
New York/New Jersey Hitmen players
Northern Colorado Bears football players